Events from the year 1584 in the Kingdom of Scotland.

Incumbents
Monarch – James VI

Events
Decrees in Absence Act 1584
Disqualification of Ministers Act 1584
Sovereignty Act 1584
Unlawful Jurisdictions Act 1584
Plague in Glasgow

Births
John Strang

Deaths
William Ruthven, 1st Earl of Gowrie
Patrick Gray, 4th Lord Gray
October – Colin Campbell, 6th Earl of Argyll

See also
 Timeline of Scottish history

References